KGLR-LP channel 30 was a Cornerstone affiliate in Lubbock, Texas. The station broadcast FamilyNet programming.

The station's license was cancelled by the Federal Communications Commission on August 7, 2014 for failure to file a renewal application.

External links
KGLR-TV official web site

Television stations in Lubbock, Texas
Defunct television stations in the United States
Television channels and stations disestablished in 2014
2014 disestablishments in Texas
GLR-LP